The 1911 Major League Baseball season was contested from April 12 to October 26, 1911. The New York Giants and Philadelphia Athletics were the regular season champions of the National League and American League, respectively. The Athletics then defeated the Giants in the World Series, four games to two.

This was the first of four seasons that the Chalmers Award, a precursor to the Major League Baseball Most Valuable Player Award (introduced in 1931), was given to a player in each league.

This is the most recent major league season from which no stadiums remain in use. The Boston Red Sox have used Fenway Park as their home field since the 1912 season.

Awards and honors
Chalmers Award
Ty Cobb, Detroit Tigers, OF
Wildfire Schulte, Chicago Cubs, OF

Statistical leaders

Standings

American League

National League

Postseason

Bracket

Events
 June 27 – Stuffy McInnis of the Philadelphia Athletics hits a warm-up pitch by Boston Red Sox pitcher Ed Karger for an inside-the-park home run.
 July 12 – Ty Cobb of the Detroit Tigers steals second, third and home on consecutive pitches by Philadelphia Athletics pitcher Harry Krause.
 July 24 – In the Addie Joss Benefit Game, a team of American League all-stars defeats the Cleveland Naps, 5-3, and raise $12,914 for Joss's widow.

Managers

American League

National League

References

External links 
1911 Major League Baseball season schedule at Baseball Reference Fetched January 14, 2018
1911 in baseball history from ThisGreatGame.com

 
Major League Baseball seasons